Shadow Lake Dam is a dam on Nut Swamp Brook in Monmouth County, New Jersey. The dam impounds Shadow Lake. It has a main overflow spillway, an earthfill berm and an emergency spillway on the right. Hubbard Road (County Route 12) crosses over its crest.

References
 Shadow Lake

Buildings and structures in Monmouth County, New Jersey
Dams in New Jersey